The British National Track Championships are held annually and organised by British Cycling (formerly the British Cycling Federation). The main events are various track cycling disciplines for elite athletes to determine the British national champions. However, competitions are also held in age and disability categories.

Until 1994 both amateur and professionals could take part in the 'Open' events, in addition to specific events that were restricted to either.  

The modern era is considered to have started in 1994 eventually replacing the amateur era. In November 1994, British Cycling moved its headquarters to the National Cycling Centre, Manchester, which held been opened earlier in the year by Princess Anne. Consequently, the Championships were held at Manchester Velodrome from 1995 to 2020. The 2021 Championships were cancelled due to the COVID-19 pandemic and the delayed Olympic Games and the 2022 National Championships were held at the Geraint Thomas National Velodrome.

Venues and dates
1973–1994 (Leicester Velodrome)
1995–2020 (Manchester Velodrome)
2022–2023 (Geirant Thomas Velodrome)
2016, 2021 (not held)

Derny
See British National Derny Championships

Keirin
See British National Keirin Championships

Madison
See British National Madison Championships

Omnium
See British National Omnium Championships

Points
See British National Points Championships

Pursuit (individual)
See British National Individual Pursuit Championships

Pursuit (team)
See British National Team Pursuit Championships

Scratch
See British National Scratch Championships

Sprint (individual)
See British National Individual Sprint Championships

Sprint (team)
See British National Team Sprint Championships

Time Trial 
See British National Individual Time Trial Championships

Reference List

Cycle racing in the United Kingdom
National track cycling championships
National championships in the United Kingdom
Annual sporting events in the United Kingdom